One Hundred Little Mothers (Italian: Cento piccole mamme) is a 1952 Italian melodrama film directed by Giulio Morelli and starring William Tubbs, Lia Amanda and Clelia Matania. It is a remake of the 1936 French film Forty Little Mothers.

Cast
 William Tubbs as Prof. Martino Prosperi
 Lia Amanda as Anna 
 Clelia Matania as director Sampieri
 Checco Durante as commissioner
 Juan de Landa as Don Michele 
 Ugo D'Alessio

See also
 Forty Little Mothers (1936)
 Forty Little Mothers (1940)

References

External links
 

1952 films
Italian drama films
1950s Italian-language films
Italian remakes of French films
Films directed by Léonide Moguy
1952 drama films
Italian black-and-white films
1950s Italian films